McKeon and MacKeon are Irish surnames originating both from the Gaelic Mac Eoghain ("Son of Eoghan") and Mac Eoin ("Son of John"), which are pronounced identically.  Other variants in English include MacEoin and McKeown. Notable people with the name include:

 Alistair McKeon, fictional character in the Honorverse 
 Beverley McKeon, British physicist and aerospace engineer
 Emma McKeon (born 1994), Australian Olympic swimmer
 Howard "Buck" McKeon (born 1938), American politician
 Jack McKeon (born 1930), American baseball manager and executive
 John McKeon (1808–1883), New York lawyer and politician, U.S. Representative
 John F. McKeon (born 1958), American politician
 Kaylee McKeown (born 2001), Australian Olympic swimmer
 Larry McKeon (1944–2008), American politician
 Lindsey McKeon (born 1982), American actress
 Matt McKeon (born 1974), American soccer player
 Matthew McKeon (1924–2003), U.S. Marine
 Myles McKeon (1919–2016), Roman Catholic bishop
 Nancy McKeon (born 1966), American actress
 Philip McKeon (1964–2019), American actor (and brother of Nancy McKeon)
 Richard McKeon (1900–1985), American philosopher
 Scott McKeon, British blues rock guitarist, songwriter, singer, and music tutor 
 Sean McKeon (born 1997), American football player
 Stephen McKeon, Irish film music composer

See also 
McKeen (surname)
McKean (surname)
Mac Eoin Bissett family

Patronymic surnames

Surnames from given names